Voyage to India is the second studio album by American singer India Arie, released on September 24, 2002, by Motown. The album is titled after a track by Arie's idol Stevie Wonder from his 1979 album Journey Through "The Secret Life of Plants".

The album debuted at number six on the Billboard 200 and at number one on the Top R&B/Hip-Hop Albums chart, selling 109,000 copies in its first week. It was certified platinum by the Recording Industry Association of America (RIAA) on August 4, 2006. At the 2003 Grammy Awards, it won Best R&B Album, and the single "Little Things" won Best Urban/Alternative Performance. The song "Get It Together" was featured on many film soundtracks, including Brown Sugar (2002) and Shark Tale (2004).

Critical reception

Voyage to India received generally positive reviews from music critics. At Metacritic, which assigns a normalized rating out of 100 to reviews from mainstream publications, the album received an average score of 65, based on 15 reviews. John Bush of AllMusic said that Arie had "much to prove" after her successful debut, especially due to the notable trend of other neo soul artists, such as D'Angelo, Erykah Badu and Macy Gray, faltering with their second albums. Bush, however, found Voyage to India a "beautiful surprise" as it "easily equals her debut, boasting better vocal performances but also better songwriting and accompanying production."

Track listing

Sample credits
 "Little Things" contains an interpolation of "Hollywood" by Rufus.

Personnel
 India Arie – vocals, guitar
 Brent Barrett – electric guitar 
 Algebra Blesset – backing vocals
 John Catchings – cello
 David Davidson – violin
 Steve Grossman – percussion
 Tony Harrell – keyboards
 Tony Tony HarrellHarrington – backing vocals
 Kerisha Hicks – backing vocals
 Avery Johnson – bass
 Doug Kahan – bass
 Paige Martin – backing vocals
 Terry McMillan – percussion 
 Blue Miller – backing vocals, acoustic guitar
 Musiq – backing vocals 
 Ricky Quinones – guitar
 Andrew Ramsey – guitar
 Dave Ramsey – guitar
 Forrest Robinson – drums
 Bryant Russell – bass
 Shannon Sanders – keyboards, percussion
 Khari Simmons – bass
 Joyce Simpson – vocals
 Laurneá Wilkerson – backing vocals
 John Willis – electric guitar 
 Obataiye Samuel - songwriter

Charts

Weekly charts

Year-end charts

Certifications

References

2002 albums
Grammy Award for Best R&B Album
India Arie albums
Motown albums